The 2011 SAFF Championship Final was the final match of the 2011 SAFF Championship which took place in India on 11 December 2011. The final match took place between India and Afghanistan. India entered the final as defending champions after winning their fifth title in 2009. While for Afghanistan this was  their first final.

Venue
It was originally scheduled to take place in Orissa, India, but was switched to New Delhi by the executive committee of the All India Football Federation on 22 September.

The Jawaharlal Nehru Stadium in New Delhi was the main venue for the tournament. It is also the home stadium for the India national football team and hosted the 2010 Commonwealth Games.

Route to the final

Match

Match rules
90 minutes.
30 minutes of extra-time if necessary.
Penalty shoot-out if scores still level.
Maximum of three substitutions.

See also
 2011 SAFF Championship

References

2011 SAFF Championship
SAFF Championship Finals
2011 in Asian football
2011–12 in Indian football
2011 in Afghan football
Afghanistan national football team matches
India national football team matches
December 2011 sports events in India
Sport in New Delhi